Julio Enrique González Herrera (December 20, 1920 – February 15, 1991) was a Major League Baseball pitcher who played for the Washington Senators in .

External links

1920 births
1991 deaths
People from Banes, Cuba
Major League Baseball pitchers
Major League Baseball players from Cuba
Cuban expatriate baseball players in the United States
Washington Senators (1901–1960) players
Crowley Millers players
El Paso Texans players
Galveston White Caps players
Havana Cubans players
Odessa Eagles players
Odessa Oilers players
Phoenix Stars players
St. Petersburg Saints players
Wichita Falls Spudders players